Berkin is both a given name and a surname. Notable people with the surname include:

Given name
Berkin Elvan (1999–2014), Turkish victim of police brutality
Berkin Kamil Arslan (born 1992), Turkish football player
Berkin Usta (born 2000), Turkish Olympian alpine skier

Surname
Carol Berkin (born 1942), American historian and author

See also
Burkin